Steve Tittle (born May 20, 1935) is a Canadian composer and music educator.

Biography 
Tittle was born in Willard, Ohio. He studied composition at Kent State University with Harold Miles, John White and Fred Coulter, and at University of Wisconsin–Madison with Hilmar Luckhardt, Robert Crane and Burt Levy.  He was a school music teacher 1962-65 in Ohio, and his early performance experience was as a trumpet player in US Navy bands (including the USS Iowa BB-61 ship's band) and in ensembles in Ohio and Wisconsin.

In 1970 he joined the faculty of Dalhousie University, where until 1994 he was associate professor of composition and theory.  Founder and co-designer of the Dalhousie Experimental-Electronic Sound Studio, he also inaugurated an improvisation ensemble, Murphy's Law ensemble, which has evolved into the new music ensemble.  He was a 1971 charter member, secretary and artistic director (1981-6) of NOVA MUSIC("inNOVAtions in MUSIC", an ensemble which preceded Murphy's Law by two years) and in 1989, together with several other Halifax professional musicians, created its successor, Upstream.  In these enterprises, and in numerous solo and ensemble appearances in the city, as conductor, organizer, trumpet and flügelhorn player, and mallet percussionist, he was a catalyst for new music performance life in the Maritimes, in particular introducing the potential of synthesizer and tape composition to the region.  Tittle has performed with other noted composers and musicians, including Philip Glass and Allen Ginsberg.  He is a charter member of the Atlantic Canadian Composers Association and producer of its chamber music recording. Tittle is also a member of SOCAN and the Canadian League of Composers.  Now retired from teaching, he lives in Nelson, B.C.

Tittle is a prolific composer, primarily in smaller forms. Drawing on influences from jazz, minimalist, and non-Western musics, he creates in each piece an original statement that is subtle, novel, and engaging both for the performer and the listener.  Works such as orange-blossom book, it is all there all the time, where there is no other (only we), let it shine all the time, messages (four), and what finally matters most is grace are poised between Western and Asian aesthetics: an impression of timelessness and of the mobile tend to disguise tight control of material and logical, dynamic conclusions.  The interplay between tape and performer in innocence and natural right, salvation dharma band, and only/other/always achieves a linear unity and contrapuntal contrast that is both lyric and deft.

Tittle has been commissioned by the Atlantic Symphony Orchestra and Symphony Nova Scotia, Music Gallery New Music Concerts, CBC Radio, the Canadian Electronic Ensemble, the Kronos Quartet, Lawrence Cherney, Rivka Golani, Philippe Djokic, the Atlantic Camera Trio, the Karr-Lewis Duo, Scotia Festival, Technical University of Nova Scotia, and Dalhousie University. He has also written for CBC Radio drama, the NFB, and the Nova Scotia Communications and Information Centre. He has recorded one album on Nerve Records, (one of the) merely players. He is an associate of the Canadian Music Centre.

Tittle has also recorded music for several films, including Farmers Helping Farmers (1987), In Love and Anger: Milton Acorn - Poet (1984), My Urban Garden (1984), Miller Brittain (1981), and The Ross Family Mystery (1980).

References

1935 births
Living people
Canadian composers
Canadian male composers
Academic staff of the Dalhousie University
Kent State University alumni
Canadian music educators
University of Wisconsin–Madison alumni
People from Willard, Ohio